Cedar Township, Arkansas may refer to:

 Cedar Township, Carroll County, Arkansas
 Cedar Township, Polk County, Arkansas
 Cedar Township, Scott County, Arkansas

See also 
 List of townships in Arkansas
 Cedar Township (disambiguation)

Arkansas township disambiguation pages